Cornifrons phasma is a moth in the family Crambidae. It was described by Harrison Gray Dyar Jr. in 1917. It is found in North America, where it has been recorded from California and Nevada.

Adults are on wing from April to June and in September.

References

Evergestinae
Moths described in 1917